Ondavka is a small village and municipality in Bardejov District in the Prešov Region of north-east Slovakia.

History
In historical records the village was first mentioned in 1618

Geography
The municipality lies at an altitude of 480 metres and covers an area of 3.468 km2.
It has a population of about 16 people.

References

External links
http://www.statistics.sk/mosmis/eng/run.html

Villages and municipalities in Bardejov District
Šariš